Abby F. Dernburg is a Professor of Cell and Developmental Biology at the University of California, Berkeley, an Investigator of the Howard Hughes Medical Institute, and a Faculty Senior Scientist at Lawrence Berkeley National Laboratory.

Education and early career 
Dernburg received her Bachelor of Arts in Biochemistry in 1987 from the University of California, Berkeley. There, she spent half a year working in an organic chemistry lab before she joined Dan Koshland's laboratory, studying bacterial chemotaxis, or how cells and organisms move in response to a chemical stimulus. Following graduation, she spent a year working as a research technician in Koshland's lab, where she co-authored a study analyzing the structure of a bacterial sensory receptor.

Dernburg then entered the Tetrad Program at the University of California, San Francisco for her doctoral work. She received her PhD in 1996 working in the laboratory of John Sedat studying several aspects of chromosomes organization and function. She developed fluorescence in situ hybridization (FISH) methods to study the genetic content of cells and to investigate how chromosomes are organized within cell nuclei. Using these tools she investigated how chromosome organization within the nucleus can affect transcription, and how chromosomes interact to separate from each during the process of meiosis, using the fly Drosophila as a model organism. Specifically, she used FISH to monitor the chromosomal position of regions of heterochromatin—a tightly packed region of DNA associated with non-expressed genes—and of a fly gene called brown, which codes for the red pigment that gives the flies their red eyes; when the brown gene is turned off, flies have brown eyes. Heterochromatic regions of chromosomes tend to associate together in a specific compartment of the nucleus. Dernburg found that when a region of heterochromatin was inserted near the brown gene, the gene would associate with a heterochromatic region of the nucleus and would thus be inactivated, giving flies with this insertion brown eyes. The study demonstrated the effect of chromosomal positioning on gene expression. Dernburg also studied the role heterochromatin plays in chromosome segregation during meiosis, finding that the heterochromatic regions of homologous chromosomes remain associated with one another until metaphase I, or the stage at which chromosomes line up along the center of the nucleus prior to the first round of meiotic division. This association ensures that the resulting daughter cells have the appropriate number of chromosomes. She completed her dissertation, called Nuclear Architecture in Drosophila melanogaster, documenting this work in 1996. Her thesis received the Larry Sandler Memorial Award in 1997 from the Genetics Society of America, which recognizes the most outstanding dissertation in the area of Drosophila genetics and biology.

For her postdoctoral research, Dernburg joined the laboratory of Anne Villeneuve at Stanford University, where she transitioned to working on the nematode worm Caenorhabditis elegans. There, focused on the process of meiosis, which she continues to study in her own lab, she adapted FISH methods to study the cytology of chromosome pairing in the worm. In 1998, she published a study documenting how meiosis in the worm is distinct from meiosis in many other eukaryotic organisms. In most eukaryotes, double-strand breaks in the DNA are required for pairing and synapsis between homologous chromosomes during meiosis. Dernburg found that in Caenorhabditis elegans, double-strand breaks are required for recombination and for chromosome segregation during meiosis, but not for homologous pairing and synapsis. The finding suggested that there may be more diversity in meiotic mechanisms than was previously expected.

Research 

In 2000, Dernburg started up her laboratory at Lawrence Berkeley National Laboratory and the University of California, Berkeley to continue investigating chromosome organization and dynamics, focusing on meiosis using the nematode worm Caenorhabditis elegans as a model organism. Her laboratory has contributed to the community's understanding of how chromosomes find and pair with the appropriate homolog during meiosis, which is essential for proper chromosome segregation and ensuring the appropriate chromosome copy number in daughter cells. Her group has worked to understand how special regions of  chromosomes, known as pairing centers, promote homologous chromosome pairing, synapsis, and segregation in the worm. In 2005, they published a study demonstrating how pairing centers perform two separable functions during meiosis. First, they facilitate pairing through stabilizing an intermediate complex involved in the pairing process. Second, pairing centers promote the formation of a synaptonemal complex, in which a protein polymer acts as a scaffold to hold homologous chromosomes together during recombination. In a related study, her group also uncovered a conserved meiotic checkpoint that acts during meiosis to recognize unpaired/unsynapsed chromosomes. Cells identified as having unsynapsed chromosomes undergo apoptosis, or programmed cell death, to guard against the formation of sex cells with the wrong number of chromosomes.

Dernburg's group also discovered that the functions of pairing centers depend on a family of four DNA-binding zinc-finger proteins—called HIM or ZIM proteins—that recognize and bind short, repetitive sequences that are hallmarks of pairing centers. Each him or zim protein recognizes a particular pairing center sequence to help bring homologous chromosomes together. Dernburg's group first uncovered the him-8 gene, which encodes a protein responsible for proper meiotic separation of the worm's X chromosome. These proteins facilitate an interaction between the pairing centers and a complex of microtubules and a motor protein called dynein, which allow chromosomes to move along the nuclear envelope until they encounter their partner.

Dernburg has also moved beyond the nematode worm to begin to study meiotic mechanisms in planarians, which are non-parasitic flatworms, as well as another species of nematode called Pristionchus pacificus to understand how meiotic mechanisms are conserved—or diverge—across species.

The Dernburg lab also develops methods for microscopy of living nematodes. Using live cell imaging they discovered that the synaptonemal complex, the special structure that holds together homologous chromosomes and enables them to undergo meiotic recombination, is a liquid crystal. This has led them to propose a mechanism for crossover interference based on a reaction–diffusion mechanism.

In 2008, Dernburg became a Howard Hughes Medical Institute Investigator. She also has a joint appointment as a Faculty Senior Scientist at Lawrence Berkeley National Laboratory.

Awards and honors 

 Larry Sandler Memorial Award, 1997
 Presidential Early Career Award for Scientists and Engineers, National Institutes of Health, 2002
 Early Career Life Scientist Award, 2007
 Edward Novitski Prize, Genetics Society of America, 2011
Fellow, American Society for Cell Biology, 2017

References 

Howard Hughes Medical Investigators
American women biologists
University of California, Berkeley alumni
University of California, Berkeley College of Letters and Science faculty
Lawrence Berkeley National Laboratory people
University of California, San Francisco alumni
Stanford University postdoctoral scholars
Cell biologists
American geneticists
Living people
Year of birth missing (living people)
21st-century American women